Shingo Katayama (born 31 January 1973) is a Japanese golfer.

Early life and professional career
Katayama was born in Chikusei, Ibaraki Prefecture. He turned professional in 1995 and has played full-time on the Japan Golf Tour since 1997. He topped the Japan Golf Tour money list five times: 2000, 2004, 2005, 2006, and 2008.

Katayama has played in several major championships and World Golf Championships events, and his most notable achievement outside Japan is his tied fourth-place finish at the 2001 PGA Championship. He played the 3rd round with the champion David Toms. He was called "Cowboy Shingo" due to his distinctive cowboy-style hat. Placing fourth with a 10-under par at the 2009 Masters, he tied Toshimitsu Izawa (2001) for the best showing of a Japanese golfer at the tournament.

Katayama also featured in the top thirty of the Official World Golf Ranking, reaching a highest ranking of 23rd in December 2007.

Katayama rarely played on the U.S. based PGA Tour, playing the majority of his golf in Japan. His best finish outside of Japan, (excluding majors) came in 2006 at the WGC-Accenture Match Play Championship where he defeated Colin Montgomerie, 3 and 2, in the second round en route to finishing T9.

Professional wins (34)

Japan Golf Tour wins (31)

*Note: Tournament shortened to 54 holes due to weather.
 The Japan Open Golf Championship is also a Japan major championship.

Japan Golf Tour playoff record (5–3)

Japan Challenge Tour wins (2)
1993 Mito Green Open (as an amateur)
1995 Korakuen Cup (5th)

Other wins (1)
2016 Legend Charity Pro-Am

Results in major championships

CUT = missed the half-way cut
"T" = tied

Summary

Most consecutive cuts made – 3 (2007 Masters – 2007 PGA)
Longest streak of top-10s – 1 (twice times)

Results in The Players Championship

CUT = missed the halfway cut
"T" indicates a tie for a place

Results in World Golf Championships

QF, R16, R32, R64 = Round in which player lost in match play
"T" = tied
Note that the HSBC Champions did not become a WGC event until 2009.

Team appearances
Amateur
Eisenhower Trophy (representing Japan): 1994

Professional
Dynasty Cup (representing Japan): 2005
EurAsia Cup (representing Asia): 2016

See also
List of golfers with most Japan Golf Tour wins

References

External links

Japanese male golfers
Japan Golf Tour golfers
Olympic golfers of Japan
Golfers at the 2016 Summer Olympics
Sportspeople from Ibaraki Prefecture
1973 births
Living people
20th-century Japanese people
21st-century Japanese people